The 2015–16 Toto Cup Al was the 31st season of the third-important football tournament in Israel since its introduction and the 11th tournament involving Israeli Premier League clubs only. 

The competition was held in two stages. First, fourteen Premier League teams were divided into three groups, five teams in groups A and B and four teams in group C, the teams playing against each other once. The best three teams from groups A and B and the best two teams from group C advanced to the quarter-finals, which will was played over two-legged ties. The semi-finals and the final were then played as one-legged matches in a neutral venue.

The tournament started on 1 August 2015. Maccabi Tel Aviv were the defending champions, after winning the previous competition.

Maccabi Petah Tikva won the title, beating Ironi Kiryat Shmona 3–1 in the final.

Group stage
Groups were allocated according to geographic distribution of the clubs, with the northern clubs allocated to Group A, Gush Dan clubs (from Tel Aviv and Petah Tikva, allocated to Group C), and the rest to Group B. The groups were announced by the IFA on 25 June 2015.

The matches were played between 1 August 2015 and end on 17 August, with leftover matches played on 9 September, if necessary.

Group A

Group B

Group C

Knockout rounds
The quarter finals draw was held on 29 October.

All times are in Israel Standard Time

Quarter-finals

First leg

Second leg

Bnei Yehuda won 2–1 on aggregate.

Maccabi Petah Tikva won 2–1 on aggregate.

Ironi Kiryat Shmona won 2–1 on aggregate.

2–2 on aggregate. Beitar Jerusalem won 4–2 on penalties.

Semifinals

Final

See also
 2015–16 Toto Cup Leumit
 2015–16 Israeli Premier League
 2015–16 Israel State Cup

References

External links
 Official website  

Al
Toto Cup Al
Toto Cup Al